Maje Motalebi (born 31 October 1985) is an Iranian author and painter.

Biography 

Born in Tehran.

Fine Arts – Lotus educational college, London

Fine Arts – University of Fundamental Studies, St. Petersburg

Honor degree in Fine Arts – Canadian College of Dubai

Solo painting exhibition Suvereto 2014 Italy, Maria Miceli museum

Solo painting exhibition Suvereto San Martino 2016 Italy

Books

References

External links/References
 Majede Motalebi, Abebooks
 Motalebi, Amazon
 The Trappist: Majede Motalebi
 Motalebi's published books

1985 births
Living people
Iranian writers
Iranian women painters
21st-century women artists